Scottish devolution referendum may refer to:
 1979 Scottish devolution referendum
 1997 Scottish devolution referendum